Bells Are Ringing may refer to:

 Bells Are Ringing (musical), a 1956 Broadway musical, or the title song
 Bells Are Ringing (album), a 1959 jazz album by Shelly Manne featuring compositions from the above musical
 Bells Are Ringing (film), a 1960 film based on the stage musical
 "Bells Are Ringing", a Russian song with lyrics by Stepan Skitalets 
 "The Bells Are Ringing", a track from They Might Be Giants' sixth album, Factory Showroom